Yogen Früz is a Canadian chain of frozen yogurt and smoothie stores that also serves healthy alternative food products. The chain is run through company-owned, franchised, and non-traditional partnerships. The chain operates worldwide and has been rated one of the top 500 franchises for over 20 years. The global headquarters is in Markham, Ontario in the Greater Toronto Area of Canada.

History

Yogen Früz was founded in 1986 by brothers Michael Serruya and Aaron Serruya, who opened the firm's first outlet in August 1986 at   The Promenade Shopping Centre in Thornhill, Ontario, Canada. The umlaut over the "u" in the store's name is an example of foreign branding.

The store offered made-to-order frozen yogurt in cups as well as frozen shakes mixed with fresh fruit; it  was successful, and within a year the company's first franchises opened in London, Ontario. By 1989 Yogen Früz franchised its 100th store. A younger brother, Simon, joined the company in 1989 at the age of 18, while their father sold his typesetting business to oversea offices in Europe.

In December 2005, International Franchise Corp. acquired Yogen Früz and CoolBrands International's franchise division.

It is the largest franchiser of stores serving primarily frozen yogurt, with over 1,300 locations operating in more than 20 countries. The company aims to brand itself as a healthy-choice lifestyle product.

In 2016, Yogen Früz celebrated their 30 years in business, allowing customers to design the brand's new cup. The winner will have "their design featured on the company website and will be treated to five years’ worth of free frozen yogurt or a $1,000 scholarship."

Today, the company serves proprietary probiotic frozen yogurt, both mixed with fruit(s) and soft serve, and both dairy and non-dairy smoothies. For its standard yogurt cup, there are various base yogurt options such as low-fat and non-fat.

Business strategy and organization
The firm frequently uses "master franchisees", who can obtain the rights either to open stores directly or sell franchise licenses to others. Master franchisees are granted for periods varying between ten and twenty years, and usually require the franchisee to open a minimum number of outlets each year. Additionally, the firm uses a non-traditional method of expansion involving co-branding, which allowed for the mingling of Yogen Früz products with other known food services by way of "mini-counters" in established stores. As of 2008, master franchise agreements and co-branding remain the firm's main business.

The Serruya brothers initially sought expansion overseas rather than compete in the United States, because frozen yogurt dessert shops had already neared market saturation in the United States in the 1980s, and, unlike today, the average consumer was then neither familiar with nor accepting of the taste of yogurt. In early 1995 Yogen Früz franchisees operated 170 outlets in Canada, which comprised 80 percent of the frozen yogurt market in Canada. As of 2007, Yogen Früz has over 1,200 stores operating in over 25 countries including the  United States,  

In 2008, the company announced its new store design and branding, which was designed to be applied to small and large outlets in both malls and free-standing stores.

On January 14, 2010, Archeology Investments announced a master franchise agreement which grants rights to the company to open shops in Dubai, Oman, Qatar, Bahrain and Kuwait.

In February 2014, Diet & Lite Trading – an Abu Dhabi-based company and member of the Khalifa Fund – obtained the master franchise rights for the UAE.

Awards and recognition

See also
 List of frozen yogurt companies

References

External links

 

1986 establishments in Ontario
Restaurants established in 1986
Canadian companies established in 1986
2005 mergers and acquisitions
Companies based in Markham, Ontario
Fast-food chains of Canada
Fast-food franchises
Ice cream parlors
Frozen yogurt businesses
CoolBrands International